Judith Noemi Almonte Ureña (born 2 March 1999) is a Dominican Republic badminton player She participated at the 2017 Bolivarian Games in Santa Marta, and 2018 Central American and Caribbean Games in Barranquilla, Colombia.

Achievements

BWF International Challenge/Series 
Women's doubles

Mixed doubles

  BWF International Challenge tournament
  BWF International Series tournament
  BWF Future Series tournament

References

External links 
 

1999 births
Living people
Dominican Republic female badminton players
Competitors at the 2018 Central American and Caribbean Games
21st-century Dominican Republic women